The Rockstar Advanced Game Engine (RAGE) is a proprietary game engine developed by RAGE Technology Group, a division of Rockstar Games' Rockstar San Diego studio. Since its first game, Rockstar Games Presents Table Tennis in 2006, released for the Xbox 360 and Wii, the engine has been used by Rockstar Games' internal studios to develop advanced open world games for consoles and computers.

History 
Prior to developing the Rockstar Advanced Game Engine (RAGE), Rockstar Games, and primarily its Rockstar North studio, mostly used Criterion Games' RenderWare engine to develop games for PlayStation 2, Windows, and Xbox, such as the early 3D installments in the Grand Theft Auto franchise. In 2004, Criterion Games was acquired by Electronic Arts, which led Rockstar Games to switch from RenderWare, and open RAGE Technology Group as a division of Rockstar San Diego. RAGE Technology Group started developing what would later become RAGE, based on Rockstar San Diego's previous Angel Game Engine (AGE). The first game to use the engine was Rockstar San Diego's Rockstar Games Presents Table Tennis, released for Xbox 360 on May 23, 2006 and ported to the Wii more than a year later. Since then, RAGE integrates the third-party middleware components Euphoria and Bullet, as character animation engine and physics engine, respectively.

On seventh generation consoles, PlayStation 3 and Xbox 360, RAGE often saw a disparity in the optimization on the hardware: major titles on PlayStation 3 usually had lower resolution and minor graphic effects, as in Grand Theft Auto IV (720p vs. 640p), in Midnight Club: Los Angeles (1280×720p vs. 960×720p) and in Red Dead Redemption (720p vs. 640p). Despite its problems in optimization equality, in July 2009, Chris Stead of IGN voted RAGE as one of the "10 Best Game Engines of [the 7th] Generation", saying: "RAGE's strengths are many. Its ability to handle large streaming worlds, complex A.I. arrangements, weather effects, fast network code and a multitude of gameplay styles will be obvious to anyone who has played GTA IV."

Since the release of Max Payne 3, the engine supports DirectX 11 and stereoscopic 3D rendering for personal computers. Max Payne 3 also marked the first time in which RAGE was capable of rendering the same 720p resolution on a game, both on PlayStation 3 and Xbox 360. This benefit has been achieved also in Grand Theft Auto V, which renders at a 720p resolution on both consoles.

For the remastered versions of Grand Theft Auto V, RAGE was reworked for the eighth generation of video game consoles, with 1080p resolution support for both the PlayStation 4 and Xbox One. The PC version of the game, released in 2015, showed RAGE supporting 4K resolution and frame rates at 60 frames per second, as well as more powerful draw distances, texture filtering, and improved shadow mapping and tessellation quality.

RAGE would later be further refined with the release of Red Dead Redemption 2 in 2018, supporting physically based rendering, volumetric clouds and fog values, pre-calculated global illumination as well as a Vulkan renderer in the Windows version. The Euphoria engine was overhauled to create advanced AI as well as enhanced physics and animations for the game. HDR support was added in May 2019. Support for Nvidia's Deep Learning Super Sampling (DLSS) was added in July 2021.

Games using RAGE

References 

2006 software
3D graphics software
Proprietary software
Rockstar Games
Video game engines
Game engines that support Vulkan (API)